"You Make Me Brave" is a song performed by Bethel Music and Amanda Lindsey Cook. It was released as the lead single from Bethel Music's ninth album, You Make Me Brave (2014), on June 17, 2014. Amanda Lindsey Cook wrote the song. Gabriel Wilson and Daniel Mackenzie handled the production of the single.

"You Make Me Brave" peaked at number 16 on the Hot Christian Songs chart in the United States. The song has been certified gold by the Recording Industry Association of America (RIAA). The song received two awards at the 36th Annual GMA Canada Covenant Awards for Song of the Year and Praise and Worship Song of the Year.

Background
On May 28, 2014, Bethel Music that "You Make Me Brave" will be slated to impact Christian radio on June 27, 2014. The song was released in digital format on June 17, 2014.

Composition

Accolades

Commercial performance
"You Make Me Brave" debuted at number 23 on the US Hot Christian Songs chart dated May 10, 2014. The song went on to peak at number 16 and spent a total of twenty-eight non-consecutive weeks on the chart.

Music video
Bethel Music released the live music video of "You Make Me Brave" through their YouTube channel on April 5, 2014 with Amanda Lindsey Cook leading the song.

Charts

Weekly charts

Year-end charts

Certifications

Release history

Other versions
 WorshipMob released their own cover of "You Make Me Brave" on their debut album, Carry the Fire (2015).
 Shane & Shane released their own rendition of the song on their album, The Worship Initiative (2015).
 Bethel Music released an instrumental remix of the song on their instrumental album, Without Words: Synesthesia (2015).
 Bethel Music Kids released their own version of the song on their debut album, Come Alive (2015).

References

External links
  on PraiseCharts

2014 songs
Bethel Music songs